Kornelin may refer to the following places:
Kornelin, Kuyavian-Pomeranian Voivodeship (north-central Poland)
Kornelin, Łódź Voivodeship (central Poland)
Kornelin, Masovian Voivodeship (east-central Poland)
Kornelin, Greater Poland Voivodeship (west-central Poland)